William Dummer may refer to:
William Dummer (1677–1761), royal lieutenant governor and acting governor of the Province of Massachusetts Bay
William Dummer (cricketer) (1847–1922), English cricketer

See also
William Dummer Powell (1755–1834), lawyer, judge and politician of Canada